Makan Dioumassi (born July 21, 1972 in Paris) is a basketball player from France, who won the silver medal at the 2000 Summer Olympics with the Men's National Team. Playing as a shooting guard he was on the national side that claimed the bronze medal at the 2005 European Championships.

References

External links
Euroleague Statistics

1972 births
Living people
ASVEL Basket players
Basketball players at the 2000 Summer Olympics
Real Betis Baloncesto players
French men's basketball players
French expatriate sportspeople in Spain
HTV Basket players
Le Mans Sarthe Basket players
Liga ACB players
Montpellier Paillade Basket players
Olympic basketball players of France
Olympic medalists in basketball
Olympic silver medalists for France
Paris Racing Basket players
Basketball players from Paris
Medalists at the 2000 Summer Olympics
Guards (basketball)